Vauriella is a genus of birds in the Old World flycatcher family Muscicapidae that occur in Borneo and the Philippines.

The species were previously placed in the genus Rhinomyias but were moved to Vauriella when a detailed molecular phylogenetic study published in 2010 found that Rhinomyias was polyphyletic. The genus Vauriella had been introduced by the German ornithologist Hans Wolters in 1980.

The four species in the genus are:
 Eyebrowed jungle flycatcher (Vauriella gularis)
 White-throated jungle flycatcher (Vauriella albigularis)
 White-browed jungle flycatcher (Vauriella insignis)
 Slaty-backed jungle flycatcher (Vauriella goodfellowi)

There are also several species called "jungle flycatcher" in the genus Cyornis.

References

 
Bird genera